Afshan (also Romanized as Afshān; also known as Afshār) is a village in Ashar Rural District, Ashar District, Mehrestan County, Sistan and Baluchestan Province, Iran. At the 2006 census, its population was 1,078, in 236 families.

References 

Populated places in Mehrestan County